The spot-tailed nightjar (Hydropsalis maculicaudus) is a species of nightjar in the family Caprimulgidae. It is found in Honduras, Mexico, Nicaragua, and every mainland South American country except Chile and Uruguay.

Taxonomy and systematics

The spot-tailed nightjar was described as Stenopsis maculicaudus and later moved into genus Caprimulgus with many other members of nightjar family. (A few authors placed it in genus Antiurus between those times.) DNA evidence now places it firmly in genus Hydropsalis. It is monotypic.

Description

Males weigh  and females . Their upperparts are brown, darker on the crown and paler on the rump, and spotted and barred with buff or tawny. The face is tawny or rufous with dark brown speckles, and a broad buff supercilium. The hindneck has a broad cinnamon band. The wings are mostly brown with tawny spots. The four outer tail feathers on each side are dark brown with tawny markings, two or three large white spots, and (on only the male) white tips that have a buff wash. The inner tail feathers are slightly longer than the outer ones and colored grayish brown with brown speckles and bars. The chin, throat, and breast are cinnamon to buff and the belly and flanks buff.

Distribution

The spot-tailed nightjar's distribution is highly discontinuous. One population is found in southern Mexico. Another is on the Caribbean slope in eastern Honduras and northern Nicaragua. In South America, one population is centered in eastern Colombia and extends into western Venezuela, far northwestern Brazil, and slightly into Ecuador. A second stretches from eastern Venezuela through Guyana and Suriname into French Guiana. A third resides near the mouth of the Amazon River in northeastern Brazil. The largest (in area) is found from far southeastern Peru across Bolivia and a wide swath of southern Brazil and south barely into Paraguay and Argentina.

Behavior

Movement

The South American populations of spot-tailed nightjar are apparently sedentary and those in Central American migratory.

Feeding

The spot-tailed nightjar is nocturnal. It forages by sallying from the ground or during low, slow, flight. Its diet is entirely insects; it has been documented preying on insects of at least 17 families in six orders.

Breeding

The spot-tailed nightjar's breeding seasons have not been fully defined but vary considerably among the different populations. They lay their two eggs (rarely one) directly on the ground without a nest.

Vocalization

The spot-tailed nightjar's song is "a high lisping tip-SEEEUUEEET", and is sung both from the ground and from a perch. It has "a rapid t-seet t-seet t-seet t-seet" call and a "slightly wailing seeeu or see-ee-eeii in flight".

Status

The IUCN has assessed the spot-tailed nightjar as being of Least Concern. It has a large range and a large, stable, population. No immediate threats have been identified.

References

spot-tailed nightjar
spot-tailed nightjar
Birds of Central America
Birds of South America
spot-tailed nightjar
Taxonomy articles created by Polbot